Maestro is a 2021 Indian Telugu-language black comedy thriller film directed by Merlapaka Gandhi. It stars Nithiin, Tamannaah, Nabha Natesh and Jisshu Sengupta. A remake of the 2018 Hindi film Andhadhun, the plot follows a blind piano player who unwittingly becomes embroiled in the murder of a former actor.

Principal photography of the film began in December 2020 and ended in June 2021, with filming taking place in Hyderabad, Goa and Dubai. Due to the COVID-19 pandemic in India, the film skipped a theatrical release and opted for a direct-to-streaming release on Disney+ Hotstar on 17 September 2021.

Plot 
  
In Goa, Arun, a blind pianist happens to encounter Sophie to buy her piano but offers to practice it in her father's restaurant as that would bring them customers. Gradually, Arun and Sophie develop a strong bond with each other and engage in a relationship while its revealed that Arun has been faking his blindless to maintain his focus on music and ignore the surroundings. Mohan, an aged and retired actor has married a younger woman Simran two years ago and has a grown-up daughter Pavitra. Mohan, impressed with Arun's performance in the restaurant pays him an advance for a private concert at his residence on the occasion of his wedding anniversary but lies to Simran that he would leaving for Bangalore next morning and return by evening, intending to surprise her. Next day, Arun visits Mohan's apartment at the time dictated by him and Simran answers his knock. She asks him to leave as Mohan is not at home but he pursues her to confirm with Mohan as the latter paid him in advance. Seeing their neighbour Mrs. D'Souza watching over them and trusting that he is blind, Simran invites him in and pretends as if she has called Mohan. Arun plays the piano while Simran seems stressed and at the corner of his eye, catches a glimpse of the corpse lying on the floor.

He asks her to take him to washroom and realizes that the corpse is of Mohan and discovers Bobby, Simran's paramour hiding in the washroom but to rescue himself, Arun feigns ignorance and continues to play the piano while Simran and Bobby clean the blood, stuff Mohan's corpse into the suitcase and Bobby, disguised takes it away. It is revealed that Simran invited Bobby home thinking that Mohan really left for Bangalore but he gave her a surprise visit, discovering about Simran and Bobby's extra-marital affair in the process. At the present time, Arun leaves when Simran uses few voice recordings of Mohan intending to make him believe that he has arrived and also pretends as if Mohan is leaving to deal with a property issue along with 1 crore INR. Shortly after this, Arun leaves. He attempts to report the murder to Police but perceives that Bobby is a CI himself and therefore, lying as if he is at the station to ask them to find his missing cat, clears Bobby's suspicion. Mohan's corpse is found in a car and Bobby and Simran stage it as if he is murdered for the one crore, he was carrying with him and the money is not found. Arun plays piano at Mohan's condolence ceremony where Mrs. D'Souza tells SI Srinivas Naik that she had seen someone (Bobby) visiting Simran even before Mohan and Arun. Srinivas notifies Bobby of this while having breakfast with him and his wife Lakshmi, who asks Bobby to look into the matter as it may lead to his promotion. Bobby pretends as if he is going to meet Mrs. D'Souza with Naik that evening but informs Simran about it. Simran sends Pavitra to bring her medicine for headache and pretending as if she is having a terrible pain, knocks the door of Mrs. D'Souza's residence asking her for medicine but pushes her off the balcony and wets the floor to convince everyone that she slipped off the balcony. Arun happens to witness this as he comes to teach playing piano to Pavitra. However, he continues to play blind. Police arrive and conclude that she slipped off the balcony as the floor was wet while Arun leaves. 

Arun invites Sophie home intending to reveal the truth to her while a kid of the neighbour films his actions, that prove that he has been faking his blindness. Simran visits Arun at his home to give him offerings of the prayer, she conducted for Mohan. She tries to test Arun to know if he is really blind but he continues to play along with his lie. Arun witnesses Simran adding something in his coffee cup and intentionally slips it off his hand after which Simran threatens him with a gun and he reacts only to learn that the gun was fake and Simran is convinced that he is not blind. Arun promises not to reveal about her murders to anyone while she reveals that her relationship with Mohan was good but her meeting with Bobby and subsequent friendship changed her life and if Mohan didn't give her a surprise visit, she would have been happy with him. Arun finds himself feeling giddy and realizes that Simran did mix something poisonous in the offerings she had given him. Sophie, meanwhile visits Arun's residence and meets the kid who gives her the video. Realizing that he has been faking his blindness, Sophie leaves to confront him and knocks on his door. Simran opens the door and with an unconscious Arun, half-dressed lying on the bed makes it look like she had sex with him. Agitated, Sophie leaves and asks Simran to tell Arun that it is over between them. After Arun gains his senses, Simran tells him that she rendered him blind by drugging him and asks him to stay silent. She deletes the video in the kid's phone while Arun prepares to leave the place and goes to railway station, where he happens to meet Pavitra who reveals that she suspects that Mohan was not murdered for money. Arun attempts to reveal the truth but doesn't when he spots Simran over there. Simran helps Arun board the train and tells him that she did not want to kill anyone but circumstances made her take such decisions and she would kill Pavitra if she tries to investigate. Concerned for Pavitra, Arun gets off the train and meets with an accident but an auto driver Murali and his elder sister, with whom he is acquainted admit him to Dr. Swamy's hospital. Dr. Swamy, Murali and the latter's sister plan to sell Arun's organs but he reveals how Murali and his sister looked like when he met them last time proving them that he was once not blind and tells them that he could earn a crore with the plan he has. Bobby asks Simran to murder Pavitra and stage as if she committed suicide out of depression due to her father's death. 

However, Arun intervenes and rescues Simran, who tries to take him to Bobby but gets abducted. Arun, Murali and his sister call Lakshmi exposing Bobby's affair with Simran to her and demands for a crore to be given if she wants them to hide the secret. Lakshmi confronts Bobby and asks him to end the issue. Murali and his sister, planning to take all the money by themselves tie Arun along with Simran to go to the place dictated by Arun where Bobby would come with the money. Things do not go as planned as Murali gets shot by Bobby, who boards the elevator to find his sister, who is in the basement. Murali informs his sister about it through a phone call and she switches the elevator off and Bobby finds himself trapped. He shoots the door of the elevator, agitated but the bullet bounces back killing him. Murali's sister takes Murali to hospital but realizes that the money Bobby bought with him is counterfeit. 

Meanwhile, Simran helps Arun free himself and asks him to break a glass for escaping but she silently frees herself too and ambushes Arun. Swamy arrives to protect him and renders Simran unconscious using chloroform. Swamy reveals to Arun that Simran has a rare blood type and her organs worth millions could be sold to a rich billionaire for his daughter's treatment and also suggests that her cornea can be used to bring Arun's eyesight back. 

After two years, abroad, Sophie comes across Aruna at a concert and he offers to explain what happened. While travelling, Swamy stopped the car to make Simran unconscious when she regained her senses but she stabbed him and drove the car without Arun's knowledge. Presuming that Swamy was driving the car, Arun asked "him" to handover Simran to Police rather than selling her organs, which is immoral. Simran revealed herself and dropped Arun off the car, apparently changed. However, she tried to run over him but lost control over the car by a hare running from a hunter which caused an accident and killed her. Currently, Sophie reconciles with Arun after knowing what happened and suggests that he should have taken her cornea to restore his eyesight. Arun leaves and using his stick, knocks a can out of his path revealing that he indeed regained it eyesight as Simran pledged her organs to be donated after her death with Mohan in past.

Cast 
 Nithiin as Arun, a pianist
 Tamannaah as Simran, wife of Mohan
 Nabha Natesh as Sophie, Arun's girlfriend
 Jisshu Sengupta as CI N. Ravindar / Bobby
 Naresh as Mohan, former film actor
 Sreemukhi as Lakshmi  / Lucky, wife of N. Ravindar
 Ananya Nagalla as Pavithra, daughter of Mohan
 Harsha Vardhan as Dr. Swamy
 Racha Ravi as Murali, an auto driver
 Mangli as sister of Murali
 Lahari Shari as a TV Reporter
 Srinivasa Reddy as SI P. Srinivas Naik
 Duvvasi Mohan as Musical instrument shop owner
 Master Nikhil as Tinku

Production 
In September 2019, The Times of India reported that Nithiin's father Sudhakar Reddy acquired the rights for the Telugu remake of Andhadhun (2018). In February 2020, Nithiin confirmed that he will be featuring in the same. Directed by Merlapaka Gandhi, the film was formally launched with a pooja ceremony in that month. The music is composed by Mahati Swara Sagar while J. Yuvaraj is signed as the director of photography. In March 2021, the film's title was unveiled as Maestro.

In September 2020, Tamannaah and Nabha Natesh were cast in the roles played by Tabu and Radhika Apte respectively in the original. Tamannaah sought not to emulate Tabu, but give the character her own interpretation, and avoided re-watching Andhadhun. Nabha noted that her character "will be tweaked" to suit the Telugu nativity.

Principal photography was originally scheduled to begin in November 2020, but ultimately began in Dubai in December. Filming took place in Hyderabad in March 2021. Due to the COVID-19 lockdown in India, filming was paused for two months i.e., April and May. The final schedule resumed on 14 June 2021 in Errum Manzil, Hyderabad, and ended on 20 June.

Music 

Mahati Swara Sagar is the composer of the score and soundtrack. The first single "Baby O Baby" was released on 16 July 2021 by Aditya Music. The second single "Vennello Aadapilla" was released on 6 August 2021. The third single "La La La" was released on 6 September 2021. The last single "Shuru Karo" was released on 12 September 2021.

Release 
In February 2021, the film's release date was announced as 11 June 2021. In August 2021, it was announced officially that the film would be skipping theatres due to the COVID-19 pandemic in India; instead it would have a direct-to-streaming release on Disney+ Hotstar. The film was released on 17 September 2021. In the United States, the film is exclusively available on Hotstar's corporate sibling Hulu as Hotstar ceased operations in the country.

Reception 
Neeshita Nyayapati of The Times of India gave Maestro a rating of 3 out of 5, calling it "a pulpy remake" and wrote that it "might not be the classic Ilairayaaja number it set out to be but it still remains as catchy as the latest peppy number. That makes it worth a watch". Writing for Firstpost, Sankeertana Varma opined that Maestro never pretends to be anything but a tamed version of its original, giving a rating of 3 out 5. Hindustan Times critic Haricharan Pudipeddi said that "Despite not making any effort to leave a lasting impression, it still works as a good-enough entertainer. The minor tweaks to suit Telugu sensibilities, helps Maestro stay true to the original to a large extent but the audience is spoon-fed a lot too."

Reviewing the performances, Sangeetha Devi Dundoo of The Hindu wrote, "Nithiin seems to have enjoyed being part of a story that stands out from mainstream Telugu films, and Nabha is at ease playing the girlfriend. It isn't a complicated part and she does well. It is appreciable that Tamannaah has dubbed herself, but her laboured Telugu diction doesn't cut it. Alas, she is no Tabu." On the technical aspects, The News Minute Balakrishna Ganeshan said that the music and Mahati Swara Sagar's background music did justice the film and Yuvraj's camera work "keeps the movie upbeat."

Koimoi Shubam Kulkarni rated the film 2.5/5, stating: "Maestro might have been a spectacular film if Andhadhun didn't exist, but that if is a privilege the film doesn't have". A critic of Eenadu praised the performances of Nithiin and Tamannaah, first-half screenplay and the production values while pointing out second-half screenplay negative as its drawback. Manoj Kumar R of The Indian Express called it an "unwitty remake", adding "Director Merlapaka Gandhi has turned the pulsating white-knuckled ride into a story of a damsel in distress. Nitthin-starrer has none of the moral ambiguity or smarts of Ayushmann Khurrana-Tabu original." Mukesh Manjunath of Film Companion wrote, "The lack of humor and its blandness makes the thrills seem milder because the audience is never distracted enough with humor."

References

External links 

 at Disney+ Hotstar

2020s Telugu-language films
2021 black comedy films
2021 crime thriller films
2021 direct-to-video films
2021 films
Counterfeit money in film
Disney+ Hotstar original films
Film productions suspended due to the COVID-19 pandemic
Films about blind people in India
Films about pianos and pianists
Films not released in theaters due to the COVID-19 pandemic
Films postponed due to the COVID-19 pandemic
Films set in Dubai
Films set in Goa
Films shot in Dubai
Films shot in Goa
Films shot in Hyderabad, India
Indian black comedy films
Indian crime thriller films
Indian direct-to-video films
Telugu remakes of Hindi films
Telugu-language Disney+ Hotstar original programming
Films directed by Merlapaka Gandhi